Discitoceras is an extinct genus of nautiloids from the Lower Carboniferous.

References

Prehistoric nautiloid genera
Carboniferous cephalopods
Carboniferous animals of Europe
Carboniferous animals of North America